Gusty Peak was named by Glen Boles in 1972 after making the first ascent, having completed it during extremely windy weather. It is located in the Kananaskis Range in Alberta.

Climate

Based on the Köppen climate classification, Gusty Peak is located in a subarctic climate with cold, snowy winters, and mild summers.

References

External links
 Gusty Peak weather site: Mountain Forecast

Three-thousanders of Alberta
Alberta's Rockies